Felicistas were the supporters of Félix Díaz, nephew of former president Porfirio Diaz, who opposed the Madero and Carranza governments in Mexican rebellions between 1913 and 1920.

Factions of the Mexican Revolution